Rapidly exploring dense trees is a family of planning algorithms that includes the rapidly exploring random tree.

References

Search algorithms